Robert Howie Fisher (1861–1934) was a Scottish minister in the 19th century who became Chaplain in Ordinary to King George V in Scotland from 1913.

Life

He was born on 27 April 1861 the son of Rev Matthew Fisher, minister of Cross and Burness parish on the isle of Sanday, Orkney. He was educated at George Watson's School in Edinburgh. He took a general degree at Edinburgh University graduating MA in 1880 then a degree in Divinity graduating BD in 1884. He was licensed to preach as a minister of the Church of Scotland by the Presbytery of Edinburgh in May 1884.

His first post was as assistant in St Bernard's Church in Stockbridge, Edinburgh. He was ordained as minister of Skelmorlie in August 1885. He translated to Jedburgh Parish church in November 1890 and in 1896 moved to West Church, Aberdeen. In October 1900 he translated to Morningside Parish Church in Edinburgh. In 1905 he was living in Morningside Manse on Morningside Park, west of the church.

Edinburgh University awarded him an honorary Doctor of Divinity (DD) in 1905. In 1913 he was made Chaplain in Ordinary to King George V.

In May 1914 he moved to St Cuthbert's Church, Edinburgh as first minister. Here he was in office until 1925 when he retired and was replaced by Rev George MacLeod.

He died on 2 November 1934. He is buried in Dean Cemetery in the west of the city.

Family
On 26 October 1886, at St Giles' Cathedral, he married Margaret Ada Hutchison (born 10 November 1863, died 15 January 1899), daughter of Robert Hutchison of Carlowrie and sister of Thomas Hutchison, Lord Provost of Leith. They had a son, Matthew George Fisher (born 1888) who became an advocate, and daughters, Mary Tait Fisher (born 1891) and Charlotte Williamina Tait Fisher (born 1895).

In 1906 he married Edith Mary Strathearn, daughter of Robert Strathern WS, widow of William Percival Lindsay WS.

Publications

Fisher was editor of Life and Work church magazine from 1902 to 1925.

The Four Gospels (1899)
The Beatitudes (1912)
The Outside of the Inside: Reminiscences (1919)

References
 

1861 births
1934 deaths
People from Orkney
People educated at George Watson's College
Alumni of the University of Edinburgh
Deans of the Chapel Royal
19th-century Ministers of the Church of Scotland
20th-century Ministers of the Church of Scotland